Hugh Nissenson (March 10, 1933 in New York City – December 13, 2013 in Manhattan) was an American author. Nissenson drew heavily on his Jewish background in his writing, exploring themes of mysticism, Israel, and the Holocaust.

Biography
Hugh Nissenson was born in New York on March 10, 1933, the only child of Charles and Harriette Nissenson. Nissenson's father immigrated to the United States from Warsaw in 1910, working in a sweatshop sweater factory and later as a salesman. His mother, born Harriette Dolch, was born in Brooklyn to immigrant parents from Lvov, Poland.

After attending the Fieldston School in The Bronx, New York, Nissenson attended Swarthmore College, graduating with a bachelor's degree in 1955. He worked briefly as a copy boy at the New York Times, but was encouraged by his mother to pursue his love of fiction. Nissenson spent time in Israel in the 1950s and 1960s, reporting on the Adolf Eichmann trial for Commentary magazine, and spending time in kibbutz Ma'ayan Baruch, which formed the basis for his 1968 Notes from the Frontier.

In 1976, Nissenson published his first novel, My Own Ground.

Nissenson died on December 13, 2013 at his home in Manhattan, New York. He was survived by his wife Marilyn and two daughters Kate and Kore.

Publications
A Pile of Stones (1965)
Notes from the Frontier (1968)
In The Reign of Peace (1972)
My Own Ground (1976) 
The Tree of Life (1985) 
The Elephant and My Jewish Problem (1988) 
The Song of the Earth (2001) 
The Days of Awe (2007) 
The Pilgrim (2011)

Awards

Won
 1965 Edward Lewis Wallant Award - A Pile of Stones
 2002 Gaylactic Spectrum Awards - The Song of the Earth

Nominated
 1985 National Book Award - The Tree of Life
 2001 James Tiptree, Jr. Award - The Song of the Earth
 2011 Langum Prizes - The Pilgrim

References

1933 births
2013 deaths
American male writers
PEN/Faulkner Award for Fiction winners